The 2009 FIFA Beach Soccer World Cup CONMEBOL qualifier, also later and commonly known as the 2009 South American Beach Soccer Championship, was the third Beach Soccer World Cup qualification championship for South America, held from March 11–15 in Montevideo, Uruguay.

The qualifiers were not coordinated by CONMEBOL at the time. The event was organised by Beach Soccer Worldwide (BSWW), under the FIFA Beach Soccer World Cup Qualifier title. CONMEBOL began recognising the tournaments in 2013, under the title South American Beach Soccer Championship, also acknowledging the 2006–11 events as historic editions of the championship. CONMEBOL eventually began organising the qualifiers in 2017, under a new title.

Brazil won the championship, with the hosts Uruguay taking 2nd place. Third place Argentina scraped through to move on to play in the 2009 FIFA Beach Soccer World Cup in Dubai, United Arab Emirates along with the two finalists.

Participating nations

Group stage

Group A

 Ranking among URU, ARG, CHI by tiebreak

Group B

Knockout stage

Semi-finals

Third Place Play Off

Final

References

External links
FIFA BSWC Qualifiers

Beach
2009
2009 FIFA Beach Soccer World Cup
2009
2009 in beach soccer
2008–09 in Uruguayan football